Ali Abedi is an Iranian football player who currently plays for the Iranian football club Malavan in the Iran Pro League.

Club career

Malavan
He started his career with Malavan youth levels. He was promoted to first team by Nosrat Irandoost in summer 2014. He made his debut for Malavan in 2014–15 Iran Pro League against Sepahan as a substitute for Reza Etemadi.

Club career statistics

References

External links
 Ali Abedi  at IranLeague.ir

Living people
Iranian footballers
Malavan players
1994 births
Association football forwards
People from Shiraz
Sportspeople from Fars province